John Loughlin (December 20, 1817 – December 29, 1891) was an Irish-born prelate of the Roman Catholic Church. He was the first Bishop of Brooklyn, of the U.S. state of New York (1853–1891).

Early life
John Loughlin was born in Drumbonniff, County Down, Ireland to John and Mary (née McNulty) Loughlin. At the age of six he came with his parents to the United States, where they settled in Albany, New York. He received his early education at The Albany Academy, and entered the college of Chambly in Quebec, Canada, at age fourteen. After three years at Chambly, he returned to the United States and enrolled at Mount St. Mary's Seminary in Emmitsburg, Maryland. He was ordained to the priesthood by Bishop John Hughes on October 18, 1840. He then served as a curate at St. John's Church in Utica until 1841, when he was transferred to St. Patrick's Cathedral in New York City. In 1850, he was named vicar general of the Archdiocese of New York.

Tenure as Bishop
On June 19, 1853, Loughlin was appointed the first Bishop of the newly erected Diocese of Brooklyn by Pope Pius IX. He, along with James Roosevelt Bayley, first Bishop of Newark, received their episcopal consecration on the following October 30 from Archbishop Gaetano Bedini, with Bishops John McCloskey and Louis Amadeus Rappe serving as co-consecrators.

During his 38-year-long tenure, the Catholic population of the diocese increased from about 15,000 to nearly 400,000. Bishop Loughlin erected 125 churches and chapels, 93 parochial schools, two colleges, 10 orphanages, five hospitals, two homes for the aged, a home for destitute boys, and a seminary. He erected the Chapel of the Resurrection at Holy Cross Cemetery in 1855.

In 1861, he expressed his support for the Union during the Civil War. He attended the Plenary Councils of Baltimore (1852, 1866, 1884) as well as the First Vatican Council (1869–1870) in Rome, where he was named an Assistant at the Pontifical Throne.

Loughlin died at his residence in Brooklyn, New York, aged 74.

Legacy
Bishop Loughlin Memorial High School in Brooklyn is named for him.

References

1817 births
1891 deaths
19th-century Roman Catholic bishops in the United States
Irish emigrants to the United States (before 1923)
Mount St. Mary's University alumni
Christian clergy from County Down
Roman Catholic bishops of Brooklyn
The Albany Academy alumni
American Roman Catholic clergy of Irish descent